Chontalia cyanicollis is a species of beetle in the family Cerambycidae, the only species in the genus Chontalia.

References

Lepturinae